Ngiri-Ngiri is a municipality (commune) in the Funa district of Kinshasa, the capital city of the Democratic Republic of the Congo.

It is situated in the south of Kinshasa. Ngiri-Ngiri is one of the settlements which were built in the 1940s, located at the foot of the Kalamu and Kasa-Vubu hills to the south of the province.

Demographics

References

See also 

Communes of Kinshasa
Funa District